Acugamasus is a genus of mites in the family Ologamasidae. There are about 19 described species in Acugamasus.

Species
These 19 species belong to the genus Acugamasus:

 Acugamasus cursor Lee, 1970
 Acugamasus drakensbergensis (Ryke, 1962)
 Acugamasus elachyaspis Lee, 1973
 Acugamasus grahami (Ryke, 1962)
 Acugamasus hluhluwensis (Ryke, 1962)
 Acugamasus knysnaensis (Ryke, 1962)
 Acugamasus losovensis (Pinchuk, 1972)
 Acugamasus macrosetosus (Ryke, 1962)
 Acugamasus montanus (Willmann, 1936)
 Acugamasus natalensis (Ryke, 1962)
 Acugamasus neotasmanicus (Ryke, 1962)
 Acugamasus nepotulus (Berlese, 1908)
 Acugamasus paranatalensis (Ryke, 1962)
 Acugamasus parvipectus Karg, 1977
 Acugamasus plumitergus Karg, 1997
 Acugamasus punctatus (Womersley, 1942)
 Acugamasus semipunctatus (Womersley, 1942)
 Acugamasus tuberculatus Karg, 1993
 Acugamasus watsoni (Hirschmann, 1966)

References

Ologamasidae
Articles created by Qbugbot